"You" is a 1977 single by Australian recording artist Marcia Hines, first recorded by writer Tom Snow on his 1975 Taking It All in Stride LP. "You" was the second single from her third studio album, Ladies and Gentlemen, released in October 1977. It peaked at No. 2 in Australia, and remains Hines' highest-charting single in Australia.

The song was nearly kept from Hines as Robie Porter, the producer, had put the song into his "don't use" pile. Mark Kennedy – her backing band's drummer – saw the sheet music in the studio and began arguing the song's worth to Porter. Porter subsequently changed his mind about the song.

Hines' "You" is a dance song. Her version was not released in North America, and the following year it was covered in the U.S. by Rita Coolidge.

Track listing
 7" / 45 RPM single (MS-508)
Side A: "You"
Side B: "In a Mellow Mood"

Chart performance

Weekly charts

Year-end charts

Credits
Engineer – Jim Hilton, Peter Walker
Orchestrated By – Rick Formosa, Tony Ansell
Producer, Arranged By, Conductor – Robie G. Porter

Rita Coolidge version

Rita Coolidge covered "You" and released it as the first single from her sixth album, 1978's Love Me Again.  Her version, in contrast to Hines', is more mellow in tone.  Coolidge's version became a Top 40 hit in both the United States and Canada during the summer of 1978, debuting on the Hot 100 at No. 83 on 1 July 1978 and reaching No. 25 there on 26 August 1978 and No. 17 in Canada.  "You" was a major success on the Adult Contemporary charts, reaching No. 3 in the U.S. and No. 1 in Canada.  Coolidge's version did not chart in Australia, even though Hines' version had hit there.

Chart performance

Weekly charts

Year-end charts

2005 remix versions
A digital remix EP was released on 4 March 2005 and was included on the 'Tour Edition' of her album Discothèque.
 Digital Download
 "You"  (2005 Remaster) (3:27)
 "You"  (2004 Remaster) (3:17)

References

External links
 Song Lyrics
 
 

1977 singles
1978 singles
Marcia Hines songs
Rita Coolidge songs
Songs written by Tom Snow
1977 songs
A&M Records singles